Coleophora umbratica is a moth of the family Coleophoridae. It is found in the United States, including Ohio.

The larvae feed on the leaves of Prunus and Betula species. They create a spatulate leaf case.

References

umbratica
Moths of North America
Moths described in 1914